Rafael Mora (born 4 June 1952) is a Colombian long-distance runner. He competed in the marathon at the 1976 Summer Olympics.

References

1952 births
Living people
Athletes (track and field) at the 1976 Summer Olympics
Colombian male long-distance runners
Colombian male marathon runners
Olympic athletes of Colombia
Place of birth missing (living people)